Gold Coast United Football Club was an Australian professional football (soccer) club based on the Gold Coast of Queensland. The club was formed in 2008, and played their first competitive match in August 2009 in the A-League. The club played its home matches at Robina Stadium. More than 50 players appeared for the Gold Coast side in their three seasons, those players are listed here.

Gold Coast United's record appearance-maker is Michael Thwaite, who played 82 matches for the club.

Key
 The list is ordered first by date of debut, and then if necessary in alphabetical order.
 Appearances as a substitute are included.

Players

Club captains
Two players held the position of captain of Gold Coast United. The first club captain was Jason Culina, who was captain from 2009 to 2011. After Culina left the club, Michael Thwaite was named captain, a position he held until the end of the club's final season in 2012.

Notes
 A utility player is one who is considered to play in more than one position.

References

 
Gold Coast United
Association football player non-biographical articles
Gold Coast, Queensland-related lists